Gliese 569 is a  ternary star system composed of a main-sequence star orbited by a pair of brown dwarfs in the constellation of Boötes about  away.

System 
The primary star GJ 569A is orbited by the much fainter (3.7 stellar magnitudes) secondary GJ 659B at a projected separation of 5.92 arcseconds, discovered in 1988. The star GJ 569B (BD+16 2708B) itself is a close binary system of two high-mass brown dwarfs in a 2.4-year orbit, and a small (0.538) magnitude difference between components. The orbital plane of close binary GJ 569Ba and GJ 569Bb is expected to precess at timescales of about 100 thousand years due to the gravitational influence of GJ 569A.

Properties 
The primary star Gliese 569A is a flare star. The nature of brown dwarf binary Gliese 569B is highly uncertain, and it was even suspected Gliese 569Ba itself may be either a low-mass star or a binary object. Both brown dwarfs are weakly variable, likely due to starspot activity.

References 

Triple star systems
Boötes
072944
J14542923+1606039
BD+16 2708
0569
Bootis, CE
M-type main-sequence stars
Brown dwarfs